Eugen Bari (born 24 June 1971) is a former professional Slovak football forward, and currently manager of TJ Sklotatran Poltár. Bari was nicknamed "The Slovak Romário" after the famous Romário of Brazil.

Personal life
He is of Roma (Gypsy) origin. His son Kristián is currently playing for MŠK Žilina.

External links
Futbalnet profile

References

1971 births
Living people
Slovak footballers
Slovak Romani people
Romani footballers
Association football forwards
FC Baník Prievidza players
FC DAC 1904 Dunajská Streda players
FC Nitra players
FK Dubnica players
MŠK Novohrad Lučenec players
FK Dukla Banská Bystrica players
Slovak Super Liga players